Chromosome 9 is one of the 23 pairs of chromosomes in humans. Humans normally have two copies of this chromosome, as they normally do with all chromosomes. Chromosome 9 spans about 150 million base pairs of nucleic acids (the building blocks of DNA) and represents between 4.0 and 4.5% of the total DNA in cells.

Genes

Number of genes
These are some of the gene count estimates of human chromosome 9. Because researchers use different approaches to genome annotation, their predictions of the number of genes on each chromosome varies (for technical details, see gene prediction). Among various projects, the collaborative consensus coding sequence project (CCDS) takes an extremely conservative strategy. So CCDS's gene number prediction represents a lower bound on the total number of human protein-coding genes.

Gene list

The following is a partial list of genes on human chromosome 9. For a complete list, see the link in the infobox on the right.

Diseases and disorders
The following diseases are some of those related to genes on chromosome 9:

 acytosiosis
 ALA-D deficiency porphyria
 Amyotrophic lateral sclerosis
 citrullinemia

 Coronary artery disease
 chronic myelogenous leukemia (t9;22 - the Philadelphia chromosome)
 Diaphyseal Medullary Stenosis with Malignant Fibrous Histiosytoma (DMS-MFH, Hardcastle Syndrome)
 Ehlers-Danlos syndrome
 familial dysautonomia
 Friedreich ataxia
 galactosemia
 Gorlin syndrome or nevoid basal cell carcinoma syndrome 
 hereditary hemorrhagic telangiectasia
 lethal congenital contracture syndrome
 nail-patella syndrome (NPS)
 nonsyndromic deafness
 OCD
 polycythemia vera
 porphyria
 primary hyperoxaluria
 Tangier's disease
 tetrasomy 9p
 thrombotic thrombocytopenic purpura
 trisomy 9
 tuberous sclerosis
 VLDLR-associated cerebellar hypoplasia

Cytogenetic band

References

External links

 
 

Chromosomes (human)